Mamahdel (also known as Mamdal and Mamdīl) is a village in Zarrineh Rud-e Shomali Rural District of the Central District of Miandoab County, West Azerbaijan province, Iran. At the 2006 National Census, its population was 3,273 in 731 households. The following census in 2011 counted 3,555 people in 984 households. The latest census in 2016 showed a population of 3,821 people in 1,170 households; it was the largest village in its rural district.

References 

Miandoab County

Populated places in West Azerbaijan Province

Populated places in Miandoab County